The Rio Turtle or Turtle Rock is a turtle-shaped rock located in the North River along Augusta-Ford Hill Road (West Virginia Secondary Route 53) approximately  west of the community of Rio, West Virginia. While this stretch of the North River forms the border between Hampshire and Hardy Counties, the Rio Turtle is located on the Hampshire side.

Over the past few decades, the rock has been continually maintained and repainted by both local professional artists and graffiti artists and has become a popular tourist attraction and picnic rock in the North River Valley. After the September 11, 2001 attacks and the 2003 invasion of Iraq, the Rio Turtle's shell took a more patriotic and politically charged motif, including American flags, Christian crosses, and peace symbols. As of early Autumn 2006, the rock has been repainted and restored to its original tortoiseshell motif.

Gallery

References

External links

Landmarks in West Virginia
Tourist attractions in Hampshire County, West Virginia
Geography of Hampshire County, West Virginia